Andreea Prisăcariu (born 9 February 2000) is a Romanian professional tennis player.

Prisăcariu has career-high WTA rankings of 304 in singles and 200 in doubles. She has won four singles titles and seven doubles titles on the ITF Women's Circuit.

Prisăcariu won her biggest title at the 2021 Solgironès Open Catalunya, in the doubles event partnering Valentina Ivakhnenko.

ITF Circuit finals

Singles: 5 (4 titles, 2 runner–ups)

Doubles: 10 (8 titles, 2 runner–ups)

Notes

References

External links
 
 

2000 births
Living people
Romanian female tennis players
Sportspeople from Iași